Cassida deflorata is a greenish coloured beetle in the leaf beetle family.

Distribution
The beetle can be found in Africa, including Algeria and Morocco, as well as in European countries like France, Italy, Portugal and Spain.

Habitat
The species feeds on plants in the family Asteraceae, including Arctium lappa, Carduus tenuiflorus, Cirsium dyris, cardoon, artichoke, Jacobaea maritima and Silybum marianum.

References

Cassidinae
Beetles described in 1844
Beetles of North Africa
Beetles of Europe
Taxa named by Christian Wilhelm Ludwig Eduard Suffrian